Pluma ( "feather") may refer to:

Places
 Pluma Hidalgo, a town and municipality in Oaxaca, Mexico
 Pluma de Pato, a village and rural municipality in Salta, Argentina

Science
 Pluma (fish), a name in the West Indies of a fish, Calamus calamus
 Pluma (meat), a cut of Iberian pork
 Pluma (text editor), small and lightweight UTF-8 text editor for the MATE environment
 Pluma porgy, an ocean-going fish of the family Sparidae, Calamus pennatula

Other uses
 Peso pluma,  a weight class division in fighting sports

See also
 
 
 Plumas (disambiguation)
 Bluma (disambiguation)
 Plume (disambiguation)
 La Plume (disambiguation)